Vimala Pons (born 15 March 1986) is a French actress and juggler of part Indian descent. Her notable films include The Rendez-Vous of Déjà-Vu (2013), La Loi de la jungle (2016), Elle (2016) and The Wild Boys (2017).

Filmography

Feature films

Short films

Television

External links 

 

1986 births
Living people
21st-century French actresses
French film actresses
French television actresses
Jugglers